Harold Andrés Ramírez Lemus (born September 6, 1994) is a Colombian professional baseball outfielder for the Tampa Bay Rays of Major League Baseball (MLB). He previously played in MLB for the Miami Marlins and Cleveland Indians.

Career

Pittsburgh Pirates
Ramírez signed with the Pittsburgh Pirates as an international free agent in July 2011. He made his professional debut in 2012 with the Rookie-level Gulf Coast Pirates. In 39 games, Ramírez batted .259 with one home run and 12 RBI. In 2013, he played for the Short Season-A Jamestown Jammers, and hit .285 with five home runs, 40 RBI, and 23 stolen bases in 71 games played.

In 2014, Ramírez was promoted to the Class-A West Virginia Power, where he appeared in 49 games and batted .309 with one home run and 24 RBI. He also set the team record for longest hitting streak. Ramírez continued to make his way through the Pirates minor league system, playing the entire 2015 season with the Advanced-A Bradenton Marauders. In 80 games, he would record a .337 batting average, four home runs, 47 RBI, and 22 stolen bases. The Pirates added him to their 40-man roster after the 2015 season. In the offseason, Ramírez played 15 games with the Venados de Mazatlán of the Mexican Pacific League, and hit .245 with one home run and 5 RBI against pitchers that were, on average, over eight years older than he was. In his first season with the Double-A Altoona Curve, he was selected to play in the 2016 Eastern League All-Star Game. He had been batting .300/.355/.401 in 70 games at the time of his selection.

Toronto Blue Jays
On August 1, 2016, the Pirates traded Ramírez, along with Francisco Liriano and Reese McGuire, to the Blue Jays for Drew Hutchison. Ramírez was optioned to the Double-A New Hampshire Fisher Cats. He would play in just one game for New Hampshire before being placed on the disabled list, where he finished 2016. In 99 total games, Ramírez hit .311 with two home runs and 50 RBI. Ramírez appeared in 121 games for New Hampshire in 2017, and batted .266 with a career-high six home runs and 53 RBI. On November 20, 2017, he was outrighted off the 40-man roster. Ramírez spent 2018 with the Fisher Cats, appearing in 120 games and hitting .320 with 11 home runs and 70 RBI. He elected free agency on November 2, 2018.

Miami Marlins
On November 26, 2018, Ramírez signed a minor-league contract with the Miami Marlins.

He began 2019 with the New Orleans Baby Cakes. On May 11, his contract was selected and he was called up to the major league roster. He made his debut that night versus the New York Mets, hitting a single off Edwin Diaz for his first MLB hit.

Ramírez reached base safely in 18 of his first 19 MLB games and made starts at all three outfield positions during his rookie season. He led the team with three walk-off plays, including walk-off home runs on August 1 and August 29.

Ramírez only had 10 at-bats for Miami in 2020, going 2 for 10 with two singles, two strikeouts and walk. On February 17, 2021, Ramírez was designated for assignment following the acquisition of John Curtiss.

After the 2020 season, Ramírez joined the Caimanes de Barranquilla in the Colombian Professional Baseball League. With Caimanes, his hometown team, he competed in the 2021 Caribbean Series, batting .238/.238/.333 with two doubles in 21 plate appearances.

Cleveland Indians
Ramírez was claimed off waivers by the Cleveland Indians on February 24, 2021. Over 99 games, Ramírez batted .268/.305/.398 with 7 home runs and 41 RBIs. He was designated for assignment by the newly-renamed Cleveland Guardians on November 19, 2021.

Ramírez rejoined Caimanes de Barranquilla in 2021, which again represented Colombia in the 2022 Caribbean Series. Caimanes defeated the Dominican team, Gigantes del Cibao, for the 2022 title, marking the first time a Colombian team won the tournament; Ramírez and the rest of his teammates were welcomed to the presidential palace by Colombian President Iván Duque. During the campaign, Ramírez slashed .333/.355/.400 with two doubles and three RBI.

Tampa Bay Rays
Ramírez was traded to the Chicago Cubs on November 22, 2021 in exchange for cash considerations. On March 25, 2022, Ramírez was traded to the Tampa Bay Rays in exchange for Esteban Quiroz. Ramírez's salary for the 2023 season was determined by the arbitration process to be $2.2 million.

Personal life 
Ramírez and his wife Adriana have a son named Elian, born in October 2016.

References

External links

1994 births
Living people
Altoona Curve players
Baseball players at the 2015 Pan American Games
Bradenton Marauders players
Cleveland Indians players
Colombian expatriate baseball players in Mexico
Colombian expatriate baseball players in the United States
Gulf Coast Pirates players
Jamestown Jammers players
Leones del Caracas players
Colombian expatriate baseball players in Venezuela
Major League Baseball outfielders
Major League Baseball players from Colombia
Miami Marlins players
New Hampshire Fisher Cats players
New Orleans Baby Cakes players
Sportspeople from Cartagena, Colombia
Tampa Bay Rays players
West Virginia Power players
Venados de Mazatlán players
2023 World Baseball Classic players